This list includes football players who played for K.S.K. Beveren. The players are listed by country.

References

 
K.S.K. Beveren